Natalie Marie Decker (born June 25, 1997) is an American professional stock car racing driver who competes part-time in the NASCAR Xfinity Series and ARCA Menards Series, driving the No. 53 car for Emerling-Gase Motorsports in both series. She has also previously competed in the NASCAR Truck Series and the Trans-Am Series.

Decker was a 2016 Alan Kulwicki Driver Development competitor and 2015 Drive for Diversity participant. She is the cousin of Claire Decker and Paige Decker who have also competed in NASCAR.

Racing career

Local and regional racing
Decker won 4 karting championships in two years. She began racing in 4-cylinder modified stock cars as a 12-year-old; in 2011 she moved up to the Super Stock class and won the 2012 class championship at Marshfield Motor Speedway. Decker began racing in the ARCA Midwest Tour and took the 2013 Rookie of the Year by finishing third in points. She also took third that season in a three-race Midwest Truck Series at Madison International Speedway. In 2014, she won seven limited late model features and two super late model features. She was added to the Rev Racing team in 2015 as she was named to the NASCAR Drive for Diversity program.

NASCAR and ARCA

She was one of seven drivers to compete in the 2016 Alan Kulwicki Driver Development program; she was awarded $7,777. Decker joined her cousins Paige Decker and Claire Decker in attempting to make the field for the Alpha Energy Solutions 250 at Martinsville Speedway on April 2, 2016. Decker was 38th fastest in qualifying and her MAKE Motorsports entry did not make the field.

In 2017, it was announced that she would drive in three ARCA races for Venturini Motorsports (Elko, Toledo, and Pocono). Decker made her ARCA debut at Toledo Speedway. After spending much of the race in the Top 10, she finished eleventh on the lead lap.

Venturini later announced that they had signed Decker to drive the full 2018 ARCA schedule. Decker began the season by winning the pole at the season opening race at Daytona; she would finish fifth in a crash-filled race. Later on in the season she was injured via hernia, and was forced to start the race and have Brennan Poole jump in, in which he would finish the race in 8th. She finished the season 7th in point standings, which was last among drivers who competed in every race.

On November 30, 2018, DGR-Crosley announced plans for Decker to run a partial Truck Series schedule for the team in the 2019 season, along with some ARCA and K&N Pro Series events.

Decker's Truck series debut at Daytona saw her No. 54 Toyota cut a left front tire and rupture an oil line, setting the truck on fire on the first lap. At Kentucky Speedway in July, Decker was involved in an on-track incident with Spencer Boyd, eliminating both drivers from the race. Later, in the truck garage, Decker took Boyd’s hat off his head and slammed it on the ground before being verbally warned by a NASCAR official stating "that's enough". She was escorted away by her team.

Decker signed with Niece Motorsports for the 2020 season. On February 14, 2020, she finished fifth at Daytona, becoming the highest-finishing female driver in Truck Series history. She missed the Pocono race after being hospitalized for bile duct complications related to her gall bladder surgery in December 2019. On September 25, Decker was not medically cleared to race at Las Vegas after experiencing a high heart rate and high blood pressure; because her truck had cleared inspection and was placed on the starting grid, she was credited with a last-place finish in the race. Decker later pinpointed high blood pressure as the cause for fatigue, but with a deeper cause undetermined, she also missed the following race at Talladega Superspeedway, where Kaz Grala took the seat.

On February 5, 2021, it was announced that Decker would make her debut in the NASCAR Xfinity Series in 2021, driving the No. 23 for RSS Racing/Reaume Brothers Racing in at least five races beginning at the Daytona Road Course with sponsorship from Red Street Records, who will highlight the musicians they work with on the car, Jason Crabb being one of them. She remained in the No. 23 after Our Motorsports assumed operations.

In 2022, she attempted the Daytona season-opener with the No. 33 for Reaume Brothers Racing, but failed to qualify. However, she did qualify for the April Martinsville race, driving the No. 28 RSS Racing Ford in a collaboration with RBR. She also failed to qualify for the spring race at Talladega driving the No. 13 for MBM Motorsports. Decker was also going to run the race at Daytona in August driving the No. 5 for B. J. McLeod Motorsports. However, her sponsor, Diesel Beverages, was not approved in time for the race. Diesel Beverages is a hemp/CBD product, which NASCAR had to examine if it would be approved as a sponsor. She would be replaced in the car by Patrick Emerling. Decker stated that she hoped to run a different race later in the season if the sponsor is approved.

On February 8, 2023, it was announced that Decker would drive part-time for Emerling-Gase Motorsports in the Xfinity Series and the ARCA Menards Series in their No. 53 car in both series. It would be her first ARCA start since 2020 as well as EGM's first time fielding an entry in ARCA.

Other racing
On January 30 and 31, 2018, Decker tested a LMP3 sports car at Sebring International Raceway. The car was fielded by longtime Decker family friend Tony Ave. Ave wanted her to drive his car after he was impressed by her performance in the 2017 Road America ARCA race, where she finished 7th, which was her best finish of the season. In 2019, Decker is scheduled to race in five events for Ave's Trans Am team. She finished ninth in his TA car at Sebring International Raceway.

Decker was among the preliminary participants for the 2019 W Series, after making the initial cut from 55 drivers to 28 she did not survive the next round of cuts. Decker was scheduled to make her Trans-Am SGT class debut at Road Atlanta with Ave Motorsports in November 2020, but was forced to miss the race after testing positive for COVID-19.

In 2021, Decker raced several times for Ave in the Trans-Am Series. She took the SGT pole position in March at the Charlotte Roval and finished second in the race. She also finished second at Watkins Glen. She won the race at the Circuit of the Americas and won the SGT ProAm Challenge Title.

Personal life
Decker is the cousin of sisters Paige and Claire Decker (daughters of Allen Decker). Her father is Chuck Decker, the former owner of the Eagle River Derby Track, which hosts the World Championship Snowmobile Derby. The Track was sold in August 2018 and is now called the World Championship Derby Complex.

The Decker family was prominent in snowmobile racing in the 1970s and 1980s; four Decker brothers raced snowmobiles including Allen Decker, a factory rider for Bombardier (and onetime teammate to Jacques Villeneuve), and Natalie's father Chuck, who won the 1987 World Championship Derby race at Eagle River. The Deckers also raced snowmobiles alongside the family of Danica Patrick. Sue Decker, Natalie's aunt, introduced Patrick's parents.

On September 29, 2019, Decker revealed that she suffers from rheumatoid arthritis, which she was first diagnosed with at the age of two.

Motorsports career results

NASCAR
(key) (Bold – Pole position awarded by qualifying time. Italics – Pole position earned by points standings or practice time. * – Most laps led.)

Xfinity Series

Camping World Truck Series

K&N Pro Series East

ARCA Menards Series
(key) (Bold – Pole position awarded by qualifying time. Italics – Pole position earned by points standings or practice time. * – Most laps led.)

 Season still in progress 
 Ineligible for series points

References

External links

 
 

People from Eagle River, Wisconsin
Racing drivers from Wisconsin
Living people
American female racing drivers
1997 births
NASCAR drivers
ARCA Menards Series drivers
21st-century American women
ARCA Midwest Tour drivers